The Elakala Falls are a series of four waterfalls of Shays Run as it descends into the Blackwater Canyon in West Virginia. They are within Blackwater Falls State Park and are quite popular among photographers, with the ease of access for the first waterfall, and the relatively low traffic of the other waterfalls in the series. It is the second most popular waterfall in the park. From the official Elakala trail there is a bridge over the top of the first waterfall offering easy access and views. The remaining three waterfalls of the series are progressively more difficult to access, and have no official marked trails to them. The gorge is nearly 200 feet deep at this section accounting for the difficulty of the descent to the lower waterfalls of the series.

It has a path worn to it but is very steep and rocky terrain. Traveling beyond the second waterfall should be considered for experienced hikers only due to the danger of descending the canyon without trails. The fourth and final waterfall of the series is considered quite dangerous to access, with no trails, and should not be attempted by inexperienced hikers.

The name of the waterfalls comes from a Native American legend, although several significantly different versions exist. According to one account it involves a princess named Elakala who threw herself over the edge of the first waterfall when her lover scorned her. Another account of the legend involves a Massawomee warrior named Elakala who was girl-shy and fell to his death from the falls while being pursued by two women of his tribe. Similar legends exist for many waterfalls in the eastern United States, and there is, of course, no way to confirm these stories.

References

External links

 Blackwater Falls State Park 

Waterfalls of West Virginia
Landforms of Tucker County, West Virginia
Tourist attractions in Tucker County, West Virginia